Syzygium jasminifolium is a species of plant in the family Myrtaceae. It is a tree endemic to Peninsular Malaysia.

References

jasminifolium
Endemic flora of Peninsular Malaysia
Trees of Peninsular Malaysia
Taxonomy articles created by Polbot
Taxobox binomials not recognized by IUCN